Mahfuzur Rahman Khan,  aka, Mahfoozur Rahman Khan (10 May 1949 – 6 December 2019), was a Bangladeshi cinematographer having received the Bangladesh National Film Award for Best Cinematography a record breaking ten times during his career. Though he was also a film director, actor and producer, he was most famously remembered for working behind the camera in films directed by Humayun Ahmed and other legendary film makers including Shibli Sadik and Alamgir Kumkum.

Family

Khan was born 10 May 1949 to the renowned family of Hakim Habib Ur Rahman Road in Old Dhaka. He was the eldest of six brothers and three sisters. From a young age Mahfouz was drawn to photography, very much inspired by the photographs his father took with his 120 film box camera. Before he was sent to boarding school at Dhaka Residential Model College, Mahfouz inherited his father's camera. Back then, it would take a week for photos to come back from the developers and there was much anticipation. When his friends saw his photographs he would receive many compliments and much praise from them.

He was husband to Dr Nirafat Alam Shipra who made major contributions in her field of working with deaf children in education. She died from cancer in 2001.

Career

After passing his matric his wish was to study Photography abroad, but was advised to work for six months to a year first to gain experience. Taking this advice he began working as an assistant film director in 1966. Although his eye for calculating frames and imagining shots in his mind was invaluable to this role, his heart was really set on being a cinematographer. Whilst on set, two of the camera assistants sensed his desire and so in the evenings they would teach Mahfouz the fine art of loading a film camera. This meant splitting 1000 film reels into three parts (300, 300, and 400) in a completely dark room, measuring by hand and the imagination. He loved this process, his favourite part was hearing the click sound of the shutter after loading the film. In 1972 he started his professional work as a cinematographer for the movie Kaccher Gore.

His teacher was renowned cinematographer Abdul Latif Bachchu. From the outset he was fortunate to work with very experienced talented cinematographers like Shadon Roy, Baby Islam, Abdul Salam, Abzal Chowdury, Arun Roy, Rafiqul Bari Chowdhury who he recounted would pick up his phone call at 3AM if he needed help and Abdus Samad who gave him precious advice on shooting in black and white.

In 1985 Mahfouz received his first national award for Obhijan. He soon became known simply by his first name and many would affectionately say ‘when Mahfuz ur Rahman is the cameraman on a film then you don't need direction’. He would receive nine more national awards after this.

Four of these were films directed by acclaimed writer and director Humayun Ahmed. He spoke highly of working with Ahmed: ‘when he would describe his stories to me the images would come alive before my eyes’.

Later he also became involved in producing films and played an important role in nurturing the next generation of cinematographers. He noted how proud he was of A.R. Jahangir, Z.H.Mintu, Mubjibul Haque Buhiya and Assad Uzzaman Majnu to name a few. The belief he shared with newcomers was ‘if you do your work with love, you will only progress..’ with his life being a testament to that.

Mahfouz Ur Rahman worked as a cinematographer for over 40 years, working on over 200 films. Amidst such a prolific and phenomenal career he would say ‘I am learning everyday, I am not satisfied. In my life, my best work is yet to be done…. I want to make something that after I die, I will live on through it’.

Acting

His acting debut was in Alamgir Kumkum's Liberation War film: Amar Jonmobhumi (1973). He also played lead roles in the films: Jalader Darbar, Dabi (1978), Alo Chhaya and Cholo Ghor Badhi. However, as cinematography was his main interest, he pursued it as his career. To him it was ‘the most joyful work in the world’ and came much more easily to him than acting.

Awards

He won the Bangladesh National Film award for Best Cinematography a record ten times for the films Obhijan (1984), Sohojatri (1987), Poka Makorer Ghor Bosoti (1996), Srabon Megher Din (1999), Dui Duari (2000), Hajar Bachhor Dhore (2005), Amar Ache Jol (2008), Ghetuputra Komola (2012) and Padma Patar Jol (2015).
 Cultural Reporters' Association Award (2003)
 Bangladesh Cholochitra Sangbadik Samity (eight times)
 Meril Protom Alo award

Death
Mahfuzur Rahman Khan died on 6 December 2019 at the age of 70. He had been suffering from diabetes and lung disease for a long time. Prime Minister Sheikh Hasina expressed deep shock and sorrow at the death. In a condolence message she prayed for the eternal peace of his departed soul and conveyed profound sympathy to the bereaved family. His colleague, Mushfiqur Rahman Gulzar, general secretary of Bangladesh Film Director's Association said ‘he never misbehaved with anyone. He also helped many upcoming cinematographers.

References

External links
 

1949 births
2019 deaths
Bangladeshi cinematographers
Best Cinematographer National Film Award (Bangladesh) winners
Place of birth missing